Yek Dang (also Romanized as Yek Dāng and Yeg Dāng) is a village in Chalanchulan Rural District, Silakhor District, Dorud County, Lorestan Province, Iran. At the 2006 census, its population was 406, in 99 families.

References 

Towns and villages in Dorud County